Susanne Haworth is a retired Australian producer and film and television actress. She was a well-known child star during the 1960s, best known as Susan Wells in the children's adventure series Adventures of the Seaspray, but also had memorable guest appearances on Cop Shop, Prisoner Cell Block H and A Country Practice in her later career.

Haworth also became a successful television producer and was involved in the crime drama television series Phoenix, Secrets and Janus during the early-to mid 1990s and is the co-owner of Kuranya Pictures, a production company based in Bilgola, New South Wales, with Bill Hughes.

Biography
Susanne Haworth made her acting debut in the 1964 television film A Season in Hell. She followed this with minor roles in a second television film, Rape of the Belt (1964), and a leading role in the musical comedy film Funny Things Happen Down Under (1965). From 1965–67, Haworth was a regular cast member in the children's adventure series Adventures of the Seaspray as Susan Wells. Haworth also made appearances on children's television series The Magic Boomerang and the crime drama Homicide during the mid-to late 1960s.

After the Adventures of the Seaspray ended, Haworth took a break from acting. She returned briefly in 1976 with guest appearances on the TV series of Alvin Purple and a one-season comedy series, Who Do You Think You Are? followed by a stint in Cop Shop  in 1978. In 1980, she was cast in the cult soap opera Prisoner Cell Block H. She was initially introduced as a neighbour of Meg Jackson (Elspeth Ballantyne), the frustrated and overworked housewife Gail Summers, who is later sent to prison for child abuse. Following this, she made appearances on Holiday Island, Sons and Daughters, Taurus Rising and A Country Practice during the next two years.

In 1985, she was hired to design promos and recaps for the television miniseries A Fortunate Life. After her last acting role, Butterfly Island in 1987, she became interested in film production. In 1990, Haworth was the casting director and production assistant for the television film Jackaroo. She was also an assistant producer on the television series Phoenix, Secrets and Janus between 1992–95 and co-producer with Bill Hughes on the television film Fable in 1997.

In 2007, she co-wrote a children's book with Bob Randall entitled Stories from Country: My Pony Hooky and Other Tales. Many of these stories were partly based on traditional Aboriginal folk tales, as told by Bob Randall, from native tribes in The Red Centre and northern Australia.

Filmography

Film

Television

References

External links

Year of birth missing (living people)
Living people
Australian film actresses
Australian television actresses
Australian businesspeople